Aleksino is a rural locality (a village) in Sidorovskoye Rural Settlement, Gryazovetsky District, Vologda Oblast, Russia. The population was 18 as of 2002.

Geography 
Aleksino is located 52 km southeast of Gryazovets (the district's administrative centre) by road. Pankratovo is the nearest rural locality.

References 

Rural localities in Gryazovetsky District